Daniel Andreas Sundgren (born 22 November 1990) is a Swedish professional footballer who plays as a right-back for Israeli Premier League club Maccabi Haifa.

Club career
On 20 November 2015, he returned to AIK. In October 2017, Sundgren was hospitalized with a blood clot in his lungs, ending his 2017 season early.

In June 2019, Sundgren joined Super League Greece side Aris, set to pen a three years' contract for an undisclosed fee.

On 20 June 2022, Sundgren signed a two-year contract with Maccabi Haifa in Israel.

International career
On 1 September 2021, Sundgren was called up for the 2022 FIFA World Cup qualification matches against Spain on 2 September 2021 and against Greece on 8 September 2021, and for the friendly match against Uzbekistan on 5 September 2021. On 5 September 2021, he made his debut with national team in the friendly match against Uzbekistan. On 24 September 2022, he made his competitive international debut in a 1–4 loss against Serbia in the 2022–23 UEFA Nations League B, playing the full 90 minutes as a right back.

Personal life 
He is the son of former Swedish international footballer Gary Sundgren.

Career statistics

Club

International

Honours
AIK
 Allsvenskan: 2018

References

External links 
 

1990 births
Living people
People from Solna Municipality
Swedish footballers
Sweden international footballers
Swedish people of Finnish descent
Allsvenskan players
Superettan players
Ettan Fotboll players
Division 2 (Swedish football) players
Division 3 (Swedish football) players
Super League Greece players
Degerfors IF players
AIK Fotboll players
AFC Eskilstuna players
Akropolis IF players
Aris Thessaloniki F.C. players
Maccabi Haifa F.C. players
Swedish expatriate footballers
Expatriate footballers in Greece
Swedish expatriate sportspeople in Greece
Expatriate footballers in Israel
Swedish expatriate sportspeople in Israel
Association football defenders
Sportspeople from Stockholm County